Tsega Gebre Beyene (born 30 August 1994) is an Ethiopian professional racing cyclist. She rode in the women's road race at the 2016 UCI Road World Championships, but she did not finish the race.

Major results

2015
 3rd  Team time trial, African Games
 4th 94.7 Cycle Challenge
 African Road Championships
6th Road race
10th Time trial
2016
 African Road Championships
2nd  Team time trial
4th Road race
2017
 African Road Championships
2nd  Team time trial
5th Road race
2018
 African Road Championships
1st  Team time trial
2nd  Road race
 Africa Cup
2nd Team time trial
3rd Road race
 2nd Road race, National Road Championships
2019
 African Road Championships
1st  Team time trial
9th Road race
 1st  Road race, National Road Championships
 African Games
3rd  Team time trial
8th Road race

References

External links
 

1994 births
Living people
Ethiopian female cyclists
Place of birth missing (living people)
African Games bronze medalists for Ethiopia
African Games medalists in cycling
Competitors at the 2015 African Games
Competitors at the 2019 African Games
20th-century Ethiopian women
21st-century Ethiopian women